Berkheya is a genus of flowering plants in the aster family, Asteraceae, and the subfamily Carduoideae, the thistles. It is distributed in tropical Africa, especially in southern regions. Of about 75 species, 71 can be found in South Africa.

Most species have yellow ray florets, a few have white, and B. purpurea has light purple or mauve florets.

B. purpurea is cultivated as an ornamental plant. Some Berkheya are known as weeds.

B. coddii is a well-known hyperaccumulator. Concentration of Ni as the leaves of this species may reach  7.6% DW Ni. 

The genus was named in honor of the Dutch scientist and artist Johannes le Francq van Berkhey.

Berkheya are associated with a variety of weevils in the genus Larinus. The tephritid fruit fly Urophora agromyzella is also found on the plants.

Species 
Species include:

 Berkheya acanthopoda
 Berkheya angusta
 Berkheya angustifolia
 Berkheya annectens – thistle-thorn
 Berkheya armata
 Berkheya barbata
 Berkheya bergiana
 Berkheya bipinnatifida
 Berkheya caffra
 Berkheya canescens
 Berkheya cardopatifolia
 Berkheya carduoides
 Berkheya carlinifolia
 Berkheya carlinoides
 Berkheya carlinopsis
 Berkheya chamaepeuce
 Berkheya cirsiifolia
 Berkheya coddii
 Berkheya coriacea
 Berkheya cruciata
 Berkheya cuneata
 Berkheya debilis
 Berkheya decurrens
 Berkheya densifolia
 Berkheya discolor
 Berkheya draco
 Berkheya dregei
 Berkheya echinacea
 Berkheya eriobasis
 Berkheya erysithales
 Berkheya ferox
 Berkheya francisci
 Berkheya fruticosa
 Berkheya glabrata – yellow thistle
 Berkheya griquana
 Berkheya herbacea
 Berkheya heterophylla
 Berkheya insignis
 Berkheya latifolia
 Berkheya leucaugeta
 Berkheya mackenii
 Berkheya macrocephala
 Berkheya maritima
 Berkheya montana
 Berkheya multijuga
 Berkheya nivea
 Berkheya onobromoides 
 Berkheya onopordifolia
 Berkheya pannosa
 Berkheya pauciflora
 Berkheya pinnatifida
 Berkheya purpurea – purple berkheya
 Berkheya radula
 Berkheya radyeri
 Berkheya rhapontica
 Berkheya rigida – Augusta thistle, Hamelin thistle
 Berkheya robusta
 Berkheya rosulata
 Berkheya seminivea
 Berkheya setifera
 Berkheya speciosa
 Berkheya sphaerocephala
 Berkheya spinosa
 Berkheya spinosissima
 Berkheya subulata
 Berkheya tysonii
 Berkheya umbellata
 Berkheya viscosa
 Berkheya zeyheri

Gallery

Phylogeny 
Comparison of DNA has indicated  that Berkheya in its  current composition is paraphyletic because some of its species are more related to Cullumia, Cuspidia, Didelta and Heterorhachis than all species currently recognised as Berkeya among each other.

References

Arctotideae
Asteraceae genera
Flora of Africa
Taxa named by Jakob Friedrich Ehrhart